Peptidase A may refer to:
 Cytosol nonspecific dipeptidase, an enzyme
 Penicillopepsin, an enzyme